The HESA Shahed 278 is an Iranian-made light utility helicopter.

Iran's Shahed Aviation Industries Research Center plans to produce several variants of Shahed, according to sources. The first platform was the Shahed-278 (Oh-78), described as a light reconnaissance helicopter, armed with weapons and sensors. Test flights of the Shahed-278 (Oh-78) began in 2005.

Design
The composite Shahed-278 is a relatively light helicopter with 682 kg of empty weight. It is a four-seater; intended for dual military/civil use, though designed primarily to meet military requirements. It was designed entirely in Iran, according to the manufacturer, although some sources report use of locally made airframe and dynamic components of the Bell 206 JetRanger. Although designed by the IRGC, this helicopter is scheduled to be produced by HESA.

Shahed-278 has a four hours flight endurance and newer models can be equipped with MFD displays. The newer models are 11.82m long, 1.92m wide and 2.98m high. Body weight is increased to 750 kg. Maximum takeoff weight is 1450 kg, and maximum engine power is 420 hp.  The OH-78 variation of Shahed-278 is armed with 70mm rockets with a range of 0.5–5 km. A 12.7 mm gun is installed under the nose. The helicopter is equipped with a night-and-day vision system and a data recording system can be added as an option. The OH-78 body is reinforced and the body shape is slightly different from the other versions.

Specifications

References

See also

Shahed 278
2000s Iranian military utility aircraft
Military helicopters
2000s Iranian helicopters